Adamsdown ( or ) is an inner city area and community in the south of Cardiff, the capital city of Wales. Adamsdown is generally located between Newport Road, to the north and the mainline railway to the south. The area includes Cardiff Prison, Cardiff Magistrates' Court, Cardiff Royal Infirmary, a University of South Wales campus, and many streets of residential housing.

History
In mediaeval times, Adamsdown lay just outside the east walls of Cardiff and was owned by the lords of Glamorgan. The area may be named after an Adam Kygnot, a porter at Cardiff Castle around 1330 AD. The Welsh name Waunadda derives from (g)waun (a heath or down) and the personal name Adda (Adam). This name appears to be a recent creation, and there is no evidence that Adam Kygnot was ever called 'Adda'. Y Sblot Uchaf is the Welsh name of Upper Splott, a farm that stood on the site of the later Great Eastern Hotel (demolished 2009) on the corner of Sun Street and Metal Street.

According to an 1824 map, Adamsdown was largely a  farm. A replacement for a prison which was located on St Mary Street opened in the area in 1832, and a cemetery in 1848. In the following year, an outbreak of cholera affected the area. As the cemetery became full, it was converted into a park. In 1883 the "South Wales and Mounmouthsire Infirmary" was opened at a cost of £23,000. Many were refused from the hospital, such as those with infectious diseases and women in the advanced stages of pregnancy. In 1923, the hospital became the Cardiff Royal Infirmary.

The Newtown area of Adamsdown was the first new area to be developed, where many Irish immigrants settled. Streets built in the period had their names drawn from astronomy (such as Star, Constellation, Planet and Eclipse Streets) or precious metals and stones (such as Gold, Copper, Topaz and Diamond Streets).

The Church of St German of Auxerre, on Star Street, was designed by London architects Bodley & Garner and built 1881–84. It is described as "tall, spacious and elegant", also with a contemporary school house. The church is Grade I listed.

Cardiff's first municipal secondary school was established at Howard Gardens in 1884, which became a Grammar School in 1941 and was destroyed by bombing in World War II, where a Cardiff Metropolitan University campus now stands.

Until the 1970s, Roath Cattle Market and Slaughterhouse were located in Adamsdown where one could obtain meats off the ration during World War II. Regeneration of Adamsdown in the 20th century saw Victorian buildings demolished for 1960s and 70s tower blocks, the highest of which is Brunel House, at the eastern gateway to Cardiff city centre.

Vulcan Hotel

The Vulcan Hotel was an historic hotel and public house, formerly located in Adamsdown. Built in 1853, it was located close to the joint-railway station of Queen Street, but on the southside of the Newport Road in the working class area of the suburb. It remained unchanged from its Victorian created structure. Adjoining Victorian buildings were demolished and redeveloped around it.

In 2012, Brains Brewery finally confirmed that they were to terminate their lease on the property. Marcol Asset Management agreed to donate the building to the St Fagans National History Museum. From July 2012, the building was taken down by contractors and preservationists, to allow brick by brick movement to St Fagans. It was expected that the building would reopen at the museum in 2014, styled in a "between the wars" 1920-1930s period.

Today
 
Cardiff Magistrates' Court, Cardiff Prison, Cardiff Royal Infirmary, the Cardiff School of Creative and Cultural Industries of the University of South Wales, a Reform synagogue, and several Sikh temples can be found in this district and a mosque is under construction.

Adamsdown is one of the older working-class suburbs of Cardiff. It is about 10 minutes' walk from the commercial Cardiff city centre. It is largely a residential area, but is also home to the Rubicon Dance school. Adamsdown has undergone regeneration, in particular the shopping area of Clifton Street, where the traditional stone buildings such as Roath Police station have been sandblasted and renovated, most of the shop fronts have been replaced and updated, the pavements have been widened and a new one-way traffic system has been introduced. The aim of this was to attract more traders and shoppers to the area.

Adamsdown electoral ward

Adamsdown is both an electoral ward, and a community of the City of Cardiff.  There is no community council for the area. The Adamsdown electoral ward falls within the parliamentary constituency of Cardiff Central.  It is bounded by the wards of Penylan to the north east; Splott to the south east; Butetown to the south; Cathays to the west; and Plasnewydd to the north. In the 2016 local elections Nigel Howells (Lib Dem) and Owen Llewellyn Jones (Labour) were elected Councillors.

Transport
Cardiff Queen Street station is on the western fringe of Adamsdown. The station is on the Valley Lines urban rail network.

The area is also served by Cardiff Bus. Services stopping outside the Cardiff Royal Infirmary, which all go to City Centre in the reverse direction are:
11 (Pengam Green via Splott and Tremorfa)
30 (Newport)
44/45 (St. Mellons via Rumney)
49/50 (Llanrumney)

The 11 route runs through the heart of the area connecting it with Tremorfa/Splott to the east and the City Centre to the west. The 1/2 Bay Circle route also serves some parts of the area.

The busy and commercial Newport Road (A4161) runs through northern Adamsdown, leading towards the M4 motorway to the east and the city centre to the west. City Road leads to northern districts of Cardiff.

See also
 Royal Oak, Cardiff

References

External links
 Adamsdown Community Forum

 
Communities in Cardiff